Arne Meurman (born 6 April 1956) is a Swedish mathematician working on finite groups and vertex operator algebras. Currently, he is a professor at Lund University.

He is best known for constructing the monster vertex algebra together with Igor Frenkel and James Lepowsky.

He is interested in chess.

Publications

 Igor Frenkel, James Lepowsky, Arne Meurman, "Vertex operator algebras and the Monster". Pure and Applied Mathematics, 134.  Academic Press, Inc., Boston, MA, 1988. liv+508 pp. 
 Arne Meurman, Mirko Primc, "Annihilating fields of standard modules of sl (2,C) and combinatorial identities", Memoirs AMS 1999

References

External links

Homepage

1956 births
Living people
People connected to Lund University
20th-century Swedish mathematicians
21st-century Swedish mathematicians